Chris or Christopher Bishop may refer to:

 Christopher Bishop (born 1959), British computer scientist
 Chris Bishop (politician) (born 1983), New Zealand politician
 Christopher J. Bishop, American mathematician